"Qadam Qadam Badhaye Ja" (Hindi: क़दम क़दम बढ़ाये जा; Urdu: قدم قدم بڑھائے جا) was the regimental quick march of Subhas Chandra Bose's Indian National Army.  Written by Vanshidhar Shukla and composed by  Ram Singh Thakuri, it was banned by the British in India after World War II as seditious, with the ban subsequently being lifted in August 1947. The song has since become a patriotic anthem in India, and has been re-interpreted by various Indian musicians including C. Ramachandra, A. R. Rahman and recently by Indraadip Dasgupta in the film Gumnaami by Srijit Mukherji. The song  is currently the regimental quick march of the Indian Army.

Lyrics

References
Sources
A tribute to the legendary composer of National Anthem
Rahman's tunes bring Bose back
(Qadam Qadam Badhaye Ja .. (Every Step, Forward..)) Band of INA
Songwriter: http://bigsurmise.com/India_Songs/Indian_Songs.php?val=39

Notes

Indian patriotic songs
Indian National Army
Indian Army
1942 songs
Subhas Chandra Bose
Indian military marches